Elections to Three Rivers District Council were held on 1 May 2008.  One-third of the council was up for election.  The Liberal Democrats won the most seats, despite the Conservatives winning more votes. The Conservatives also gained a seat, strengthening their position against the Liberal Democrats, who remained stayed in overall control of Three Rivers.

The election was marked by the collapse of Labour support in South Oxhey, where Labour had been at their strongest. They lost one seat, Ashridge, to the far-right British National Party (BNP).  Another seat, Northwick, was lost to the Conservatives.  Labour's group leader, Kerron Cross, only narrowly retained his seat, with the BNP candidate coming second by 14 votes in a tight three-horse race.

After the election, the composition of the council was
 Liberal Democrat 31 (0)
 Conservative 12 (+1)
 Labour 4 (-2)
 British National Party 1 (+1)

Election result

Ward results

Footnotes

References
 BBC News results for Three Rivers
 Results on Three Rivers District Council official website

2008
2008 English local elections
2000s in Hertfordshire